Icelandic New Energy Ltd (Íslensk NýOrka ehf) is a company that promotes the use of hydrogen fuel in Iceland founded in 1999 following a decision in 1998 by the Icelandic Parliament to convert vehicle and fishing fleets to hydrogen produced from renewable energy by 2050. 

Icelandic New Energy was formed as a spin-off from the research carried out by the University of Iceland and is 51% owned by Vistorka, with the remainder owned by Daimler, Norsk Hydro and Shell Hydrogen. VistOrka itself is owned by The Icelandic New Business Venture Fund (Nýsköpunarsjóður), the Ministry of Industry and Commerce, the national electricity company Landsvirkjun, Orkuveita Reykjavíkur (Reykjavík Energy), Hitaveita Suðurnesja, the Technological Institute of Iceland, The Fertilizer Plant (Áburðarverksmiðjan), the University of Iceland and Reykjavik Resources.

Together with SEV, and the authorities in the Faroe Islands and Greenland, Icelandic New Energy has established the North Atlantic Hydrogen Association to investigate hydrogen technology.  

Since its foundation, Icelandic New Energy has managed a number of hydrogen demonstration projects in the country. The company also engages in hydrogen fuel consultancy, educational seminars and other activities.

See also
Renewable energy in Iceland
Hydrogen economy

External links
Icelandic New Energy

References

Energy companies of Iceland
Hydrogen economy
1999 establishments in Iceland
Energy companies established in 1999